"Rules" is a song by American rapper and singer Doja Cat, released on October 24, 2019, as the third single from her second studio album Hot Pink with an accompanied music video for the song being released on the same day of the single's release.  The song was written by Doja Cat, Yeti Beats, Lydia Asrat, Lukasz Gottwald, Theron Thomas, Ben Diehl and Salaam Remi. The song was produced by Tyson Trax alongside Ben Billions and Remi. Soon after its release, the song became popular on Twitter, and Doja Cat's performance was noted to be influenced by Kendrick Lamar.

Background
"Rules" was released as the third single from Doja Cat's sophomore album Hot Pink as well as being the third track on the album. Doja Cat first teased the song by releasing a still from the music video on her Instagram account on October 16, 2019 as well as another shot from the video on October 22, 2019. The song was announced upon its release along with its music video premiere.

Music video
On October 24, 2019, a music video was released alongside the song's release. Directed by Christian Sutton while video production was handled by Psycho Films, the video portrays Doja as the boss of a Cat Mafia gang with the video taking place in the desert.

Critical reception
Lakin Starling of Pitchfork wrote, "[Rules] captures a more serious—though hardly humorless—mood, pairing eerie old-western bass with Doja's memorable command: 'Play with my pussy, but don't play with my emotions.'" Following the release of the song, Shaad D'Souza of The Fader placed the song on the 20 Best Pop Songs Right Now list admiring the "loose, funky production" as well as Doja's "charisma and charm".

Many publications such as Elle and Pitchfork praised "Rules" and pointed out the similarities of Doja Cat's lyrical delivery to those of Kendrick Lamar.

Credits and personnel
Credits adapted from Hot Pink liner notes.

Recording
 Engineered at eightysevenfourteen studios (Los Angeles, California)
 Mixed at Threejonet Studios (Los Angeles, California)
 Mastered at Bernie Grundman Mastering (Hollywood, California)

Personnel

Doja Cat – vocals, songwriting
Ben Diehl – songwriting, production, all programming, all instrumentation
Salaam Remi – songwriting; production, all programming, all instrumentation
Tyson Trax – songwriting; production, all programming, all instrumentation
Lydia Asrat – songwriting
Theron Thomas – songwriting
David Sprecher – songwriting
Kalani Thompson – engineering
Seth Ringo – assistant engineering
Tyler Sheppard – assistant engineering
Clint Gibbs – mixing
Danielle Alvarez – production coordination
Mike Bozzi – mastering

Charts

Certifications

Release history

References

Doja Cat songs
2019 singles
2019 songs
Song recordings produced by Dr. Luke
Songs written by Dr. Luke
Songs written by Yeti Beats
Song recordings produced by Yeti Beats
Kemosabe Records singles
RCA Records singles
Songs written by Salaam Remi
Songs written by Theron Thomas
Songs written by Doja Cat